A fire alarm box, fire alarm call box, or fire alarm pull box is a device used for notifying a fire department of a fire. Typically installed on street corners, they were the main means of summoning firefighters before the general availability of telephones.

Operation
When the box is activated by turning a knob or pulling a hook, a spring-loaded wheel turns, tapping out a pulsed electrical signal corresponding to the box's number. A receiver at fire headquarters announces the alarm through flashing lights or tones, or via a pen recorder, and the box number is matched to a list of box locations. In modern installations a computer receives and translates the pulses; in unmanned installations in small communities, the box number may be sounded out by a horn or bell audible community-wide.

History

The first telegraph fire alarm system was developed by William Francis Channing and Moses G. Farmer in Boston, Massachusetts in 1852. Two years later they applied for a patent for their "Electromagnetic Fire Alarm Telegraph for Cities". In 1855, John Gamewell of South Carolina purchased regional rights to market the fire alarm telegraph, later obtaining the patents and full rights to the system in 1859. 

John F. Kennard bought the patents from the government after they were seized after the Civil War, returned them to Gamewell, and formed a partnership, Kennard and Co., in 1867 to manufacture the alarm systems. The Gamewell Fire Alarm Telegraph Co. was later formed in 1879. Gamewell systems were installed in 250 cities by 1886 and 500 cities in 1890. By 1910, Gamewell had gained a 95% market share.

Robustness 

Though fire alarm boxes remain in use, many communities have removed them, relying instead on the widespread availability of landline and cellular telephones. Cities like San Francisco still rely heavily on fire alarm boxes for redundancy in case of emergency. Some municipalities still maintain their fire alarm boxes near schools and other sensitive locations.

The simplicity of telegraph alarm boxes and their associated networks means that they are able to operate under conditions (such as a lengthy or widespread power outage, a natural disaster, or any emergency causing many people to attempt to contact others simultaneously) which may disrupt or disable other communication systems such as landline phones, cellular phones, and emergency services' radio systems. 

Despite lack of popular awareness that the boxes still work, a fire box was used to report a fire in Boston in December 2018 during a 9-1-1 outage.

False alarm countermeasures
In the later years of their use and proliferation, some fire boxes were designed with special devices and other functions in place in an attempt to curb the nuisance of false alarms. Some of these included an "ear-shattering" wail that would cause discomfort to someone activating the box, while others would handcuff a detachable part of the device to the person triggering the alarm, so that responding police and fire officials (who possessed the key for release) could more easily identify and contact the individual responsible for the activated alarm.

References

External links
 Gamewell-FCI company history

American inventions
Fire detection and alarm